Pompeii is the sixth studio album by Welsh singer and producer Cate Le Bon, released on 4 February 2022 by Mexican Summer.

Background and recording
Le Bon began working on the album during the first wave of the COVID-19 pandemic in Wales, in a Cardiff Victorian terrace owned by fellow Welsh musician Gruff Rhys.

Composition
Musically, Pompeii takes on "penetrating" art pop. It is also influenced by Japanese city pop, with the style reflected in Le Bon's synth work.

Critical reception

Track listing

Personnel
 Cate Le Bon – vocals, guitar, bass guitar, synthesizers, piano, percussion, production
 Samur Khouja – production, mixing, engineering
 H. Hawkline – co-production, design, photography
 Heba Kadry – mastering
 Simon Berckelman – engineering
 Euan Hinshelwood – saxophone, vocal engineering
 Stella Mozgawa – drums
 Stephen Black – saxophone, clarinet
 Chloe Dadd – engineering assistance
 Casey Raymond – photography

Charts

References

External links

2022 albums
Cate Le Bon albums
Mexican Summer albums
Albums produced by Cate Le Bon